The Sadrist Movement is an Iraqi Islamic national movement led by Muqtada al-Sadr. The movement draws wide support from across Iraqi society and especially from the Shi'a poor in the country. The most important person in setting the goals and the philosophy of the movement was Grand Ayatollah Mohammad Mohammad Sadeq al-Sadr. A prominent preceding influence had also been Muhammad Baqir al-Sadr. The movement is religious and populist. Its goal is a society ordered by a combination of religious laws and tribal customs.

On 13 June 2022, during the 2022 Iraqi political crisis, 74 MPs from Muqtada al-Sadr’s bloc resigned from parliament.

2009 governorate elections

During the 2009 Iraqi governorate elections Sadrists ran under the name Independent Free Movement.

Results
The list received 9.8% of the vote and 43 out of 440 seats, coming third overall to the State of Law Coalition and the Islamic Supreme Council of Iraq.

2010 parliamentary election
During the 2010 Iraqi parliamentary election Sadrists were part of the National Iraqi Alliance.

In a press conference on 6 March 2010 ahead of the 2010 Iraqi parliamentary election, Muqtada al-Sadr called on all Iraqis to participate in the election and support those who seek the withdrawal of U.S. troops from the country. Al-Sadr warned that any interference by the United States will be unacceptable. Al-Sadr, who has thousands of staunch followers across Iraq has consistently opposed the presence of foreign forces and repeatedly called for an immediate end to the Iraq War.

Results

Splinter factions
Over time, numerous factions in the Sadrist Movement disagreed with Muqtada al-Sadr over various issues and broke off, forming separate militias and parties:
 Asa'ib Ahl al-Haq
 Abu al-Fadl al-Abbas Forces
 Jaysh al-Mu'ammal
 Tashkil al-Hussein al-Tha'ir
 Kata'ib al-Tayyar al-Risali
 Islamic Virtue Party

Involvement in the Syrian civil war
In October 2012, various Iraqi religious sects joined the conflict in Syria on both sides. Shiites from Iraq, in Babil Governorate and Diyala Governorate, have traveled to Damascus from Tehran, or from the Shiite holy city of Najaf, Iraq, claiming to protect Sayyida Zeinab, an important Shiite shrine in Damascus. Abu Mohamed, with the Sadrist trend, said he recently received an invitation from the Sadrists' leadership to discuss the shrine in Damascus. A senior Sadrist official and former member of Parliament, said that convoys of buses from Najaf, under the cover story of pilgrims, were carrying weapons and fighters to Damascus. Some of the pilgrims were members of Iran's elite Islamic Revolutionary Guards Corps.

However, later in 2017 following the Khan Shaykhun chemical attack in Syria, Muqtada al-Sadr called for Syria's president Bashar al-Assad to step down from power.

References

2003 establishments in Iraq
Conservative parties in Iraq
Iraqi nationalism
Islamic political parties in Iraq
Nationalist parties in Iraq
Political parties established in 2003
Pro-government factions of the Syrian civil war
Shia Islamic political parties
Axis of Resistance